Plentuisa vendia is a species of land snail in the subfamily Helicellinae of the family Geomitridae, the hairy snails and their allies.

Distribution
It is endemic to Spain.

This snail is known only from the Picos de Europa range in northern Spain. It has been found at only three locations. There it lives in open, rocky habitat, taking shelter in crevices and under plants. Its entire range is within Picos de Europa National Park, where it receives some protection.

References

 Bank, R. A. (2017). Classification of the Recent terrestrial Gastropoda of the World. Last update: July 16th, 2017

External links
 Plentuisa vendia. Inventarios Nacionales. Ministerio de Agricultura, Alimentación y Medio Ambiente.

Geomitridae
Endemic fauna of Spain

Gastropod genera
Monotypic mollusc genera
Molluscs described in 1992
Taxonomy articles created by Polbot